Konstantinos "Kostas" Douvalidis (born 10 March 1987) is a Greek hurdler.

He was born in Drama.  As a junior, he won the silver medal at the 2005 European Athletics Championships, the bronze medal at the 2006 World Junior Championships and the gold medal at the 2007 European U23 Championships. He was sixth at the 2015 European Indoor Championships and eighth at the 2012 European Championships.

He competed at the 2007 World Championships, the 2008 Olympic Games without reaching the final. He has participated in four consecutive Olympic Games (2008-2020).

International competitions

†: Competed only in heat.

Personal bests

References

1987 births
Living people
Sportspeople from Drama, Greece
Greek male hurdlers
Olympic athletes of Greece
Athletes (track and field) at the 2008 Summer Olympics
Athletes (track and field) at the 2012 Summer Olympics
Athletes (track and field) at the 2016 Summer Olympics
World Athletics Championships athletes for Greece
Greek people of American descent
Mediterranean Games gold medalists for Greece
Athletes (track and field) at the 2013 Mediterranean Games
Mediterranean Games medalists in athletics
Athletes (track and field) at the 2019 European Games
European Games medalists in athletics
European Games bronze medalists for Greece
Athletes (track and field) at the 2020 Summer Olympics